Pudhu Yugam is a 1985 Indian Tamil language drama film,  directed by  S A Chandrasekhar and produced by Shoba Chandrasekhar. The film stars Sivakumar, Vijayakanth, K. R. Vijaya and Viji. This was a remake of director’s own Kannada film Simha Gharjane(1983)

Cast
Sivakumar as Rajasekar
Vijayakanth as Vijay
K. R. Vijaya as Saradha
Viji as Radha
Kalyan Kumar as Bhaskar
Anuradha as Rekha
Sangili Murugan
Vennira Aadai Moorthy
Y. G. Mahendra
Pandari Bai
Vanitha
Sujitha
V. Gopalakrishnan
S. A. Chandrasekhar

Soundtrack
Soundtrack was composed by Gangai Amaran.
"Poovo Ponno" - S. Janaki, K. J. Yesudas
"Deivam Vandhadhu" - Malaysia Vasudevan, S. N. Surendar, P. Susheela
"Anandam" -S. N. Surender, S. P. Sailaja
"Sooderum" - S. N. Surender, Vani Jairam

Reception
Jayamanmadhan of Kalki felt there were too many plots to recall and that Sivakumar's role and performance as nothing to speak about. The critic also felt Y. G. Mahendra, Moorthy and Sangili Murugan as antagonists looked more like sacrificial lambs than menacing.

References

External links
 

1985 films
1980s Tamil-language films
Films scored by Gangai Amaran
Films directed by S. A. Chandrasekhar
Indian action films